Konak kod Hilmije is a Bosnian television comedy series created and written by Feđa Isović and directed by Elmir Jukić.

The first episode of the show was aired on 7 May 2018. The so far final, 24th episode of the sitcom was aired on 2 January 2019. It has also been shown in Croatia and Serbia.

Plot
The plot of the series is located in occupied Sarajevo during World War II in Yugoslavia. Everyone comes to Hilmija's Inn. From Partisan illegals from the woods, through Chetniks, Ustashas, soldiers of the SS "Handschar", all the way to German soldiers and the commander of the town of Sturmbannführer Schiling. Everybody makes conspiracies and problems in which national tensions became less important than personal material interest.

The plot gets additionally spiced up by two miners, Partisan illegals hidden in the basement, who have been given the task by Josip Broz Tito of digging a tunnel to the German weapons warehouse.

Episodes
24 episodes so far have been filmed, with the last episode airing on 2 January 2019.

Season 1 (2018)

Season 2 (2018–2019)

Cast

Main cast
Emir Hadžihafizbegović as Hilmija Frlj, a Bosnian Muslim innkeeper who, in order to survive the war, pretends to collaborate with the occupier while secretly aiding the Partisan resistance movement
Tarik Filipović as Sturmbannführer Schiling, a naïve German major in charge of Sarajevo. Schiling is secretly gay and terrified of being sent to the Eastern Front.
Igor Skvarica as Durmiš, a Romani waiter working at Hilmija's inn. Hilmija presents him to Schiling as a Slovene named Janez (later Borut) Prešern, to save him from getting executed.
Ilir Tafa as Agim Rugoba, a Kosovo Albanian working for Chetniks, a Serbian royalist movement. Rugoba uses his Albanian identity as a cover, since nobody would presume that an Albanian is working for Serbs due to their centuries-long tensions. Throughout the series, he has shown particular fondness towards working for the Serbian crown prince.
Darko Tomović as Portugalac, a Montenegrin Partisan working as a link between Hilmija's inn and the Partisan groups in the forests around Sarajevo. He got his codename after accidentally taking a stop in Portugal while traveling to Spain.
Almir Kurt as Mustafa Zulfepuštampašić, a Bosnian Muslim quisling working as a chief of Sarajevan police hand in hand with Schilling, who's constantly annoyed with him.
Marko Cindrić as Krešimir, a Croatian Ustasha soldier who works as a petty criminal.
Mirjana Jagodić-Marinković as Baba Zorka, an old woman working in the kitchen of Hilmija's inn.
Adnan Omerović as Krhki, a Partisan with impaired hearing digging a tunnel from the basement of Hilmija's inn to the German weapons warehouse.
Milena Vasić as Rahaela Kohen, a Jewish woman that Hilmija hides in his inn. Hilmija, who is in love with her, presents her as a cook preparing sudžuka for Schiling's breakfasts, under the name of "Ana Vucibatina" in Season 1, then "Darija Hrvatić" in Season 2.
Miodrag "Miki" Trifunov as Frljoka, a Partisan with impaired vision digging the tunnel.
Bojan Perić as Vladimir Perić Valter, a Serb Partisan in charge of recruiting new people for the Partisan movement.

Other
Tarik Džinić as young Izet Fazlinović, Hilmija's nephew who works as Schiling's assistant before being recruited to Partisans by a Serb woman Ranka whom he falls in love with. Izet is the main protagonist of Lud, zbunjen, normalan, of which Konak kod Hilmije is a spin-off.
Marko Gvero as Radovan Lepinja, a Chetnik and a drunkard, who's hiding at the Inn until it's safe for him to leave. He has known Hilmija since they came in contact during  the First World War, when they were in their resprective armies. 
Marija Pikić as Azra Frlj, Hilmija's daughter and a fierce anti-fascist. Although being sent for Law studies to Zagreb by Hilmija, she secretly joins the Partisans and hides in the forests around the city.
Dino Sarija as Ivica Naguzić, a Herzegovinian Croat of flamboyant nature, pretending to be from Zagreb and Schiling's boyfriend.
Emir Kapetanović as Vaso Miskin Crni, a Partisan tasked to seduce Schiling to obtain his city defense plan.
Jana Stojanovska as Davorjanka Paunović Zdenka, Josip Broz Tito's mistress.

References

External links

Bosnia and Herzegovina culture
Bosnia and Herzegovina television series
Bosnia and Herzegovina television sitcoms
2010s Bosnia and Herzegovina television series
Television shows set in Sarajevo
World War II television comedy series